Sugar Run is an unincorporated community in Bradford County, Pennsylvania, United States. Sugar Run has a post office with ZIP code 18846.

References

Unincorporated communities in Bradford County, Pennsylvania
Unincorporated communities in Pennsylvania